San Vicente Elementary School may refer to:
 San Vicente Elementary School - Soledad, California - Soledad Unified School District
 San Vicente Elementary School - Brewster County, Texas - San Vicente Independent School District
 San Vicente Elementary School - San Vicente, Saipan, Commonwealth of the Northern Mariana Islands - Commonwealth of the Northern Mariana Islands Public School System

See also
 San Vicente Catholic School - Barrigada, Guam - Roman Catholic Diocese of Agana